This article lists political parties in Mexico.

Mexico has a multi-party system, which means that there are more than two dominant political parties.

Other political parties survive in isolation or by forming local coalitions with any of the three.

National parties
Mexico has ten nationally recognized political parties by the Federal Electoral Institute.

Under Mexican law, parties are listed in the order in which they were first registered, thus:

Other political parties, not registered 

 Communist Party of Mexico (far-left, not officially registered as party, cannot compete in elections)
 Communist Party of Mexico (Marxist–Leninist) (far-left, not officially registered as party, cannot compete in elections)
 Communists' Party (far-left, not officially registered as party, cannot compete in elections)
 Popular Socialist Party of Mexico (far-left, not officially registered as party, cannot compete in elections)
 Popular Socialist Party (far-left, not officially registered as party, cannot compete in elections)
 Progressive Social Networks (Centre-left, not officially registered as party, cannot compete in elections)
 Force for Mexico (Centre-left, not officially registered as party, cannot compete in elections)
 Solidarity Encounter Party (Right-wing, not officially registered as party, cannot compete in elections)
 Nationalist Front of Mexico (far-right, not officially registered as party, cannot compete in elections)
 National Synarchist Union (far-right, not officially registered as party, cannot compete in elections)
 Autonomous Region Party ("Unification of the northeast")
 Socialist Convergence (Convergencia Socialista - CS)  (far-left, not officially registered as party, cannot compete in elections)
 Nationalist Socialist Party Of Mexico, Spanish- Partido Nacional-Socialista de México (far-right not officially registered as party, cannot compete in elections)
 Cyber Political Party (right-wing, not officially registered as party)
 National Hope Party, Spanish- Partido Esperanza Nacional right-wing, not officially registered as party, cannot compete in elections)
 Mexico First Party (far-right, not officially registered as party, cannot compete in elections)
 México Libre (centre-right, not officially registered as party, cannot compete in elections)

Local parties
Local parties are registered with the Electoral Institute of each Mexican state according to their own criteria and regulations, which may differ from those of INE but maintaining a national relation due to the highest court in the law of political parties, the SCJN. This list is complete as of 2020.
 Democratic Unity of Coahuila (Unidad Democrática de Coahuila, Coahuila)
 Colima Democratic Association (Asociación Democrática de Colima, Colima)
 Alliance for Yucatan Party (Partido Alianza por Yucatán, Yucatán)
 Morelos First Party (Por Morelos al Frente), 2018
 Popular Awareness Party (Partido Conciencia Popular, San Luis Potosi)
Uniting Wills We Can Build (Sumando Voluntades Podemos Construir, Morelos, registered for 2021 Mexican legislative election)
More, More Social Support (Más Más Apoyo Social, Morelos, registered for 2021 elections)
Morelos Progresses (Morelos Progresa, registered for 2021 elections) 
Social Alternative Movement (Movimiento Alternativa Social, Morelos, registered for 2021 elections) 
Citizen Welfare (Bienestar Ciudadano, Morelos, registered for 2021 elections)
Morelense Political Renewal (Renovación Política Morelense, registered for 2021 elections) 
Strength, Work and Unit for the Timely Rescue of Morelos (Fuerza, Trabajo y Unidad por el Rescate Oportuno de Morelos, registered for 2021 elections) 
Morelos Force (Morelos Fuerza, registered for 2021 elections)
New Alliance (Partido Nueva Alianza, PANAL; active in several states)

Former parties
During the 19th century the two most important parties were the Liberals (Liberales) and the Conservatives (Conservadores).
 Mexican Conservative Party (1849–1867)
 Mexican Liberal Party (1905–1918)
 Progressive Constitutionalist Party (1910–1929)
 Laborist Party (1919–1929)
 Mexican Communist Party (1919–1989)
 Revolutionary Party of National Unification (1939–1940)
 Popular Force Party (1945–1948)
 Federation of Parties of the People (1945–1954)
 Authentic Party of the Mexican Revolution (1954–2000)
 Mexican Democratic Party (1979–1997)
 Mexican Workers' Party (1984–1987)
 Mexican Socialist Party (1987–1989)
 Cardenist Front of National Reconstruction (1987–1997)
 Party of the Nationalist Society (1998–2003)
 Social Democracy (1999–2000)
 Citizen Force Party (2002–2003)
 Mexican Liberal Party (2002–2003)
 Social Democratic Party (2005–2009)
 México Posible  (2002–2003)
 Party of the Democratic Centre  (1999–2000)
 Popular Socialist Party (1948–1997)
 Social Alliance Party (1998–2003)
 Socialist Workers Party (1917–1981)
 Unified Socialist Party of Mexico (1981–1987)
 Workers Party of Acapulco (Guerrero)
 Workers' Revolutionary Party (1979–1996)
 Humanist Party (2014–2015) 
 Social Encounter Party (2006–2018)
 Solidarity Encounter Party (2020–2021)
 Force for Mexico (2020–2021)
 Progressive Social Networks (2020–2021)

See also
 National political association
 Liberalism in Mexico
 Politics of Mexico
 List of political parties by country

References

External links
Federal Electoral Institute - A list of officially registered national parties can be consulted here.
Listado de Instutos Electorales Estatales - Index of links to every Electoral Institute in each state of Mexico. Lists of political parties in each state can be consulted in each website.

Mexico
 
Political parties
Political parties
Mexico